Long Way to the Top is the third release by North Carolina music group, Nantucket. The album is a tribute to AC/DC lead singer Bon Scott, who died in 1980 and features a version of their 1975 classic "It's a Long Way to the Top (If You Wanna Rock 'N' Roll)". This move landed Nantucket a spot with AC/DC on their Back in Black tour for the entire summer. Other popular songs on the album include "Time Bomb", "Rugburn" and "Turn The Radio On". Long Way to the Top was released on compact disc by re-issue label Wounded Bird Records in 2004.

Track listing
"It's a Long Way to the Top" (Young/Scott/Young)  – 4:20
"Living With You" (Redd)  – 2:21
"Time Bomb" (Redd) – 2:59
"50 More" (Redd)  – 5:21
"Media Darlin'" (Redd) - 3:28
"Rugburn" (Redd/Soule) - 3:28
"Too Much Wrong in the Past (For a Future)" (Redd/Soule/Uzzell/Downing) - 4:06
"Over and Over Again" (Redd/Soule/Uzzell/Uzzell/Blair) - 2:48
"Turn the Radio On" (Redd) - 3:02
"Tell Me (Doctor Rhythm Method) (Redd) - 2:40
"Rescue" (Redd/Soule/Uzzell/Downing/Uzzell/Blair) - 4:45
"Rock of the 80's" (Redd) - 4:34

Personnel
 Tommy Redd: Guitars, Vocals
 Larry Uzzell: Lead Vocals
 Mark Downing: Lead Guitar
 Eddie Blair: Sax, Keyboards, Vocals
 Kenny Soule: Drums
 Pee Wee Watson: Bass, Vocals

References
 Allmusic. [ Nantucket: Credits]. Retrieved Apr. 21, 2007.
 Nantucket - A Band Of Desperate Men (PKM). Nantucket: Credits. Retrieved Apr. 21, 2007.

External links
 [ Nantucket on Allmusic]
 Unofficial Nantucket Fansite
 Nantucket on MySpace

1980 albums
Nantucket (band) albums
Albums produced by Tom Allom
Epic Records albums